Lidia Talpă (born November 3, 1982 in Turnu Măgurele) is a Romanian sprint canoer who competed in the mid-2000s. She won two medals at the ICF Canoe Sprint World Championships with a silver (K-4 1000 m: 2005) and a bronze (K-4 500 m: 2006).

Talpă also competed in the K-2 500 m event at the 2004 Summer Olympics in Athens, but was eliminated in the semifinals.

References

Sports-reference.com profile

1982 births
Canoeists at the 2004 Summer Olympics
Living people
Olympic canoeists of Romania
Romanian female canoeists
ICF Canoe Sprint World Championships medalists in kayak